Manuel José Jimenes González  (January 14, 1808December 22, 1854) was a military figure and politician in the Dominican Republic.  He served as the second President of the Dominican Republic from September 8, 1848, until May 29, 1849. Prior to that he served as the country's Minister of War and Marine Affairs.

Early years
Jimenes was born on January 14, 1808, in Baracoa, Guantanamo, Cuba to Juan Jimenes and Altagracia González, Dominican exiles in Cuba because of Toussaint Louverture’s occupation of Santo Domingo (nowadays the Dominican Republic) and the subsequent wars in the context of the Napoleonic Wars. It is to note that during the early 1800s the Dominican population decreased due to the slave rebellion in Haiti, urging many Dominicans to flee the island: about 4,000 went to Cuba and 100,000 did so to Venezuela while scores exiled in Puerto Rico and Mexico; many Dominicans and their foreign-born children eventually returned to the island.

Political career
During the nascent years of the Republic, Jimenes served as the country's Minister of War and Marine Matters under Pedro Santana. When Santana relinquished the Presidency on August 4, 1848, General Jimenes was elected the constitutional President. That same year Haitian forces under Emperor Soulouque, invaded the Dominican Republic. Jimenes was unable to halt the Haitian forces and was forced to call upon Santana for military assistance. Santana was able to defeat the Haitian military, yet as a result Santana regained control of the Republic by overthrowing Jimenes.

Personal life
Jimenes married his first wife María Francisca Ravelo de los Reyes on August 19, 1835, in Santo Domingo. The couple had 5 children: María del Carmen, Isabel Emilia, María de los Dolores, Manuel María and Manuel de Jesús.

On May 21, 1849, after marrying his second wife Altagracia Pereyra Pérez, the couple had a son Juan Isidro Jimenes Pereyra, who would later become President of the Dominican Republic.

He was known for being a cockfighting enthusiast. On December 22, 1854, Jimenes died in Port-au-Prince, Haiti.

References

Biography at the Enciclopedia Virtual Dominicana
 at Aprender con la Historia

1808 births
1854 deaths
19th-century Dominican Republic politicians
People from Baracoa
Dominican Republic people of Spanish descent
Dominican Republic people of Portuguese descent
Presidents of the Dominican Republic
Marine ministers of the Dominican Republic
War ministers of the Dominican Republic
Dominican Republic military personnel
White Dominicans